Tillandsia reclinata is a species in the genus Tillandsia. This species is endemic to Brazil.

References

reclinata
Endemic flora of Brazil